St Augustine Church is one of the churches built during the creation of the new city of Valletta, Malta.

Description
The foundation stone was laid in 1571 according to the plan and guidance of Girolamo Cassar, architect of the Knights of St John. The church was rebuilt in 1765 according to a plan of Giuseppe Bonici. It was elevated to a parish church in 1968. St Augustine Hall, adjacent to the church, is part of the original plan of Cassar. The present church was consecrated by Giovanni Maria Camilleri on 1 July 1906. 

A number of the artefacts found inside the church are originals from the first church. One of these is an important sixteenth-century painting of the Augustinian Nicholas of Tolentino depicted by the famous artist Mattia Preti. This is found in the chapel of the same saint.

In the first chapel to the left, there is a painting of the Augustinian John of Sahagun who was born in Spain in 1430. It is from the school of Preti and some of its figures can be found depicted on the ceiling of St John's Co-Cathedral in Valletta. Beneath it there is a small painting of Our Lady of Grace, undated and unsigned, also from the first church.

The church is renowned for the statue of St. Rita. Her feast is celebrated in May with a procession with her statue in the streets of Valletta.

The church building is listed on the National Inventory of the Cultural Property of the Maltese Islands.

See also 

Culture of Malta
History of Malta
List of Churches in Malta
Religion in Malta

References

External links
Website of the church
MEPA

Religious organizations established in the 1570s
1571 establishments in Malta
Buildings and structures in Valletta
National Inventory of the Cultural Property of the Maltese Islands
Augustinian churches in Malta
Roman Catholic churches completed in 1794
18th-century Roman Catholic church buildings in Malta